Yoon Eun-hye (born October 3, 1984) is a South Korean actress, singer, entertainer and model. She debuted as a member of girl group Baby Vox, staying with the group from 1999 to 2005. Yoon has since moved on to acting and is best known for starring in the television dramas Princess Hours (2006), The Vineyard Man (2006), Coffee Prince (2007), My Fair Lady (2009) Lie to Me (2011) and Missing You (2012).

Career

1999–2005: Debut with Baby V.O.X
Yoon debuted as a member of Baby V.O.X at the age of 15, replacing an ex-member (Lee Gai) in 1999. Yoon was the sub-vocal in the group.

After she joined, the group released their third album Come Come Come in 1999. This album became their first major success, with their singles "Get Up" and "Killer" reaching the number one spot on the Korean music charts. In the same year, Yoon became a target of anti-fans. She was shot in the eye by an anti-fan who tried to make her blind with a mixture of soy sauce and vinegar using a water gun. She was rushed to the hospital where the doctors confirmed that her cornea was damaged.

Yoon was also a frequent guest on SBS' popular game show X-Man from 2004 to 2005, gaining popularity for her "girl-warrior" image on the show and her love-line with Kim Jong-kook.

Following fellow member Shim Eun-jin, Yoon ended her six-year activities as a member of Baby V.O.X in July 2005 when her contract with DR Entertainment expired.

2006–2007: Breakthrough success with Princess Hours and Coffee Prince
In 2006, Yoon made her acting debut in romantic comedy Princess Hours, where she played an ordinary girl who becomes the crown princess due to an arranged marriage to the crown prince. Initially, fans of the Goong manhwa questioned her acting ability, and sent out petitions against Yoon as the lead role, requesting her to be replaced. Despite the controversy, Princess Hours became a huge success across Asia and catapulted Yoon to Korean Wave stardom.

Yoon then made her debut on the big screen, starring in the film The Legend of Seven Cutter as a boxer. She returned to television with a leading role in The Vineyard Man which aired on KBS in July 2006. The Vineyard Man initially suffered low ratings, but received positive reviews for its heart-warming storyline and the cast's performances, and eventually rose in viewership. Yoon won the Best Actress award at the 2006 Grimae Awards, chosen by cinematographers in every broadcasting station in Korea.

In 2007, Yoon took on the leading role in MBC's drama Coffee Prince. She played a tomboy who was mistaken for a boy by her employer. The drama was another huge success for Yoon, who was hailed by critics as an actress who brings a colorful shade to her character. At the 44th Baeksang Arts Awards, Yoon beat out veteran actresses Kim Hee-ae and Park Jin-hee to win the coveted Best Actress award, becoming the youngest actress ever to win the award. Riding the big success of Coffee Prince and Goong, Yoon became one of the highest-paid actresses in the industry.

2008–2011: Acting criticism
In 2009, Yoon starred in KBS' romantic comedy My Fair Lady, playing an arrogant, strong-headed heiress of a rich business family. Although My Fair Lady was a moderate success, Yoon was harshly criticized for her unnatural speech and accent as well as her regression in acting skills.

Yoon returned to the big screen after five years with the coming-of-age film My Black Mini Dress (2010), based on the same titled chick lit novel by Kim Min-seo. She then starred in SBS's romantic comedy series Lie to Me (2011), playing a smart government official who is unlucky in the love department. However, both projects failed to achieve commercial success.

2012–2015: Directorial debut, acclaim and Goddess Fashion
In 2012, Yoon made her directorial debut with the short film The Knitting, which was her first assignment as a graduate student at Chung-Ang University. The film was screened at the 17th Busan International Film Festival and competed in the Korean Short Film Competition. It was also screened at the 38th Seoul Independent Film Festival as one of the five short films in the "New Choice" category. The same year, she served as jury for the  ‘Face of Short Film Awards’ at the Asiana International Short Film Festival (AISFF).

In late 2012, Yoon starred in MBC's melo-thriller Missing You, playing a victim of sexual abuse. The role marked a turning point for Yoon, who received critical acclaim for her performance. This was followed up with a leading role in KBS's romantic comedy Marry Him If You Dare, where she played a 32-year-old call center agent who travels back in time to change her future. In 2014, Yoon was cast alongside Park Si-hoo in the Chinese-South Korean romance film After Love.

In 2015, Yoon made a special appearance in the film  Chronicle of a Blood Merchant, directed by Ha Jung-woo. She then joined the second season of Goddess Fashion, a Chinese fashion design survival program where the participants have to show off their own created designs to the judges. On August 29, 2015, Yoon was awarded No. 1 in an evaluation.

2017–present: Return from hiatus
In 2017, Yoon made her return to the Korean entertainment industry by appearing as a regular in tvN's variety show Dear Pet, We Need to Talk.

In 2018, Yoon was cast in the romantic comedy drama Love Alert. This marks her return to the small screen five years since her last drama Marry Him If You Dare in 2013.

In 2019, Yoon starred in the 2-episode romance drama Go Go Song.

Controversies

Conflicts with management
In July 2007, conflicts with Yoon's Management Eight Peaks surfaced; eventually Yoon filed a Certification Of Contents (COC) to cancel her contractual agreement with the company. The contents of the first COC stated that in January 2007 Yoon was confirmed to star in the MBC drama Que Sera Sera and had even completed the script reading and rehearsal for the upcoming shoot. However, the company forced Yoon to withdraw for Yoon to star in a company-produced drama, and as an effect, she was replaced by Jung Yu-mi. After her withdrawal, Yoon took a two-day vacation to Gangwon-do in March. Eight Peaks claimed that they had no knowledge of this so-called incident and spread a rumour of Yoon's irresponsibility online which damaged her reputation. Yoon filed a second COC in August, which included evidence to support the disagreeable actions made by Eight Peaks. These actions included the improper handling and distribution/division of earnings and proceeds as well as the unilateral (one-sided) manner of making and carrying out decisions which caused immense problems"

Yoon and Eight Peaks finally came to a mutual agreement through careful negotiations and settled their disputes amicably. With her contract dispute resolved, it was reported in October 2008 that Yoon signed on with Kraze Entertainment as her new management company.

Plagiarism accusations
Following Yoon's win on the Chinese fashion program Goddess Fashion, in which she presented a white coat with collars and a unique fringe on the sleeves to give a feeling of wings following the film theme of Chronicles of Narnia, Yoon was accused of plagiarism by Korean fashion designer Yoon Choon Ho. The designer accused Yoon of ripping off his design after being made aware of her piece on the show, and posted a comparison of his creation versus Yoon's creation, stating that he and his team had worked hard on the piece from the F/W (Fall/Winter) line. Yoon Choon Ho additionally revealed that he had heard Yoon and her stylist had picked up a sponsorship outfit just days ago. Additionally, she was embroiled in another allegation of plagiarism when another design of hers was accused of being similar to a dress from 2015 F/W Dolce & Gabbana.

Yoon denied the allegations, saying that her idea for the outfit came from a 2008 Victor & Rolf style and the 2014 Lanvin Collection, which used feather decorations. She further condemned Yoon Choon Ho for trying to cash in on her fame.

Filmography

Film

Television series

Variety show

Discography

Singles

Ambassador 
 Public relations ambassador for famine countermeasures (2023)

Awards and nominations

All Awards listed below are referenced from The House Company & Naver

References

External links

 The House Company's Town Site 

1984 births
K-pop singers
Living people
Actresses from Seoul
South Korean women pop singers
South Korean female idols
South Korean female models
Kyung Hee Cyber University alumni
South Korean Christians
South Korean Protestants
South Korean film actresses
South Korean television actresses
Singers from Seoul
21st-century South Korean singers
21st-century South Korean women singers
Best Actress Paeksang Arts Award (television) winners